Anthony Biase may refer to:

 Anthony J. Biase (1909–1991), Omaha mobster
 Anthony Di Biase (born 1988), Canadian soccer player